Hesperopsis is a genus of butterflies in the skipper family, Hesperiidae.

Species include:
Hesperopsis alpheus (Edwards, 1876)
Hesperopsis gracielae (MacNeill, 1970)
Hesperopsis libya (Scudder, 1878)

References

Carcharodini
Hesperiidae genera
Taxa named by Harrison Gray Dyar Jr.